The 2014 Missouri Valley Conference women's basketball tournament, popularly referred to as "Arch Madness," as part of the 2013-14 NCAA Division I women's basketball season was played in St. Charles, Missouri March 13–16, 2014, at the Family Arena. The championship game was televised on MVC TV and simulcast on FCS Central on Sunday March 16 at 2:05 PM (central). The tournament's winner received the Missouri Valley Conference's automatic bid to the 2014 NCAA tournament.

Tournament bracket

References

External links
Missouri Valley Conference Official Website

2013–14 NCAA Division I women's basketball season
Missouri Valley Conference women's basketball tournament